Mrs. Tutti Frutti is a 1921 Austrian silent film directed by Michael Curtiz.

Cast
 Lucy Doraine
 Alfons Fryland
 Josef König
 Oskar Sachs
 Armin Springer

See also
 Michael Curtiz filmography

References

External links

Films directed by Michael Curtiz
1921 films
Austrian black-and-white films
Austrian silent feature films